Aleksandr Sergeyevich Stepanov (born 31 December 1981) is a former Russian professional football player.

External links
 
 

1981 births
Living people
Russian footballers
Association football defenders
Russian expatriate footballers
Expatriate footballers in Belarus
Belarusian Premier League players
FC Torpedo Minsk players
FC Taganrog players
Sportspeople from Taganrog